SC Lyon was an ice hockey team in Lyon, France. They were founded in 1903 and played in the Ligue Magnus from 1906-1908, before folding.

History
SC Lyon was one of the founding members of the Ligue Magnus in 1906-07. They won the first French Championship by defeating Club des Patineurs de Paris 8-2 in the final. In 1907-08, the two teams again faced each other for the title. On neutral ground in Chamonix, Patineurs was able to defeat Lyon 2-1 to win their first title. After the season, the Lyon Ice Palace closed, and the club was dissolved. With Lyon folding, the French Championship was not contested again until the 1911-12 season.

Achievements
French champion: 1907.
French runner-up: 1908.

References

Ice hockey teams in France
Ice hockey clubs established in 1903
Ice hockey clubs disestablished in 1908
1903 establishments in France
1908 disestablishments in France
Sport in Lyon